Cyanea lobata is a rare species of flowering plant in the bellflower family known by the common name Waihee Valley cyanea. It is endemic to Hawaii, where it is known from Lanai and Maui. It is a federally listed endangered species. Like other Cyanea it is known as haha in Hawaiian.

This Hawaiian lobelioid is a shrub which may exceed 2 meters in height. The stem may have branches. The inflorescence bears greenish or purplish flowers.

There are two subspecies of this plant, both very rare. One individual of ssp. lobata was found in Maui in 1982 after several decades of no observations. This plant was later killed in a landslide. In 1996 three more individuals were found. The ssp. baldwinii had not been seen since 1934 when two plants were discovered on Lanai in 2006. These are being carefully watched.

The five plants remaining of this species are threatened by the destruction and degradation of their wet and moist forest habitat. The Lanai subspecies is found in an understory where the ground is 80% covered by ferns.

References

External links
USDA Plants Profile

lobata
Endemic flora of Hawaii
Biota of Lanai
Biota of Maui
Taxa named by Horace Mann Jr.